José Gabriel de Silva-Bazán y Waldstein, 10th Marquess of Santa Cruz de Mudela (18 March 1782, in Madrid – 4 November 1839, in Madrid), was a Spanish noble, first Director of the Prado Museum between 1817 and 1820 and Mayordomo mayor between 1822 and 1823.

Biography 
He was a descendant of Álvaro de Bazán, 1st Marquess of Santa Cruz, as eldest son of José Joaquín de Silva-Bazán (1734–1802), 9th Marquess of Santa Cruz and his second Austrian wife Mariana de Waldstein (1763–1807).

He was a senator, a Knight in the Order of the Golden Fleece (1821), the Order of Calatrava and the Order of Carlos III.
He was also Gentilhombre, Mayordomo mayor and Sumiller de Corps of Ferdinand VII, member of the Regency Council during the childhood of Isabella II of Spain, Ambassador in París, special envoy to London for the coronation of George IV, and director of the Real Academia Española. He was even Prime Minister of Spain for 6 days in January 1822.

In 1817, he became the first Director of the Prado Museum. Before the Peninsular War, his father had already convinced King Charles IV not to burn the obscene paintings in the Royal collection, as was the wish of the previous King Charles III, but to store them in a private gallery.
After the War, under impulse of Queen Maria Isabel of Braganza, the Museum was created with José Gabriel de Silva-Bazán as its first Director.

He was replaced as Director by his brother-in-law Pedro de Alcántara Téllez-Girón, after the outbreak of the Liberal Triennium, but in the uncertain times following the death of King Ferdinand VII of Spain, he collaborated with the new Director José Rafael de Silva Fernández de Híjar to keep the museum's collection together.

Marriage and children 
He married in 1801 with Joaquina Téllez-Girón (1784–1851), daughter of Pedro Téllez-Girón, 9th Duke of Osuna and María Josefa Pimentel, 12th Countess-Duchess of Benavente and painted by Francisco Goya.  
They had 4 children. 
Joaquina (1802–1876), married Pedro de Alcántara Álvarez de Toledo y Palafox, XVII Duque de Medina Sidonia (1803–1867)
Inés (1806–1865), married Nicolás Osorio y Zayas, XVI Marqués de Alcañices and XV Duke of Alburquerque (1799–1866)
Fernanda María (1808–1879), married Andrés Avelino de Arteaga Lazcano y Carvajal, VI Marqués de Valmediano (1807–1850),
Francisco de Borja (1815–1889), 11th Marquess of Santa Cruz, with issue

Images by Francisco Goya

Sources
 
 Museo del Prado
 Medinaceli

1782 births
1839 deaths
Directors of the Museo del Prado
19th-century Spanish nobility
Knights of the Golden Fleece of Spain